Katarzyna Pakosińska (born April 9, 1972) is a Polish actress, comedian and former member of Polish cabaret group .

Biography 
Pakosińska was born in Warsaw on April 9, 1972. In 1991 she graduated from Arts High School and began Polish studies at the University of Warsaw.

Since 1996 to 2011, she was a member of cabaret group Kabaret Moralnego Niepokoju.

With her ex-husband, Tomasz, Pakosińska has a daughter, Maja. They live in Milanówek.

Filmography 
 1995 - Deborah as Hana Hofstein
 1997 - Łóżko Wierszynina as Ewa
 1997 - Boża podszewka as Jewish woman
 1999 - Dr Jekyll i Mr Hyde według Wytwórni A'YoY as Ann
 1999 - Badziewiakowie as journalist
 2007 - Niania as psychologist
 2011 - Hotel 52
 2011 - Linia życia

References 

1972 births
Living people
Actresses from Warsaw
Polish film actresses
Polish television actresses
University of Warsaw alumni
Polish comedians